Omar Amin (born Johann Jakob von Leers; 25 January 19025 March 1965) was an Alter Kämpfer and an honorary Sturmbannführer in the Waffen-SS in Nazi Germany, where he was also a professor known for his anti-Jewish polemics.  He was one of the most important ideologues of the Third Reich, serving as a high-ranking propaganda ministry official. He later served in the Egyptian Information Department, as well as an advisor to Gamal Abdel Nasser. He published for Goebbels, in Peron's Argentina and for Nasser's Egypt. He converted to Islam, and changed his name to Omar Amin.

Early life and education
Von Leers was born in Vietlübbe, Mecklenburg-Schwerin, Germany on 25 January 1902. He studied law at Berlin, Kiel, and Rostock and eventually worked as an attache in the foreign office. He was involved in the Bund Viking Free Corps and then in Adler und Falke. Von Leers became actively involved in völkisch politics during the Weimar Republic, and he joined the NSDAP in 1929. He was a district speaker and leader of the National Socialist Students' League, and in 1933 signed the Gelöbnis treuester Gefolgschaft, the "vow of most faithful allegiance" to Adolf Hitler.

Career

Nazi Germany
Von Leers supported himself writing freelance articles for the NSDAP press, and joined the Waffen-SS in 1936 as a sub-Sturmbannführer, eventually becoming a full honorary. He would serve as a professor at the University of Jena. He eventually was summoned by Joseph Goebbels to work in the propaganda ministry. There he was assigned to proliferate party propaganda, eventually penning 27 books between 1933 and 1945.

He wrote the notorious anti-Semitic tract (published and popular during the Third Reich), Juden sehen dich an (Jews Are Looking at You). Von Leers was fluent in five languages, including Dutch and Japanese.

Jeffrey Herf reports that in December 1942, von Leers published an article in Die Judenfrage, a journal which belonged to the anti-Semitic intellectual world, entitled "Judaism and Islam as Opposites". As the title indicates, the author's perspective is Hegelian, presenting Judaism and Islam in terms of thesis and antithesis. This essay also reveals the ingratiating National Socialist perspective which von Leers projected on the Islamic past as well as the intensity of his hatred for Judaism and Jewry. The following passage is part of the original text:

Mohammed's hostility to the Jews had one result: Oriental Jewry was completely paralyzed. Its backbone was broken. Oriental Jewry effectively did not participate in [European] Jewry's tremendous rise to power in the last two centuries. Despised in the filthy lanes of the mellah (the walled Jewish quarter of a Moroccan city, analogous to the European ghetto) the Jews vegetated there. They lived under a special law (that of a protected minority), which in contrast to Europe did not permit usury or even traffic in stolen goods, but kept them in a state of oppression and anxiety. If the rest of the world had adopted a similar policy, we would not have a Jewish Question (Judenfrage).... As a religion, Islam indeed performed an eternal service to the world: it prevented the threatened conquest of Arabia by the Jews and vanquished the horrible teaching of Jehovah by a pure religion, which at that time opened the way to a higher culture for numerous peoples ....

Realpolitik
Von Leers was a proponent of realpolitik, advocating a race-free foreign relations policy on the basis of relationship and alliance. He authored the memo which led to the exemption of non-Jewish racial minorities from race laws in the Third Reich in 1934, 1936, and 1937.

Post-war
In 1945 he fled to Italy, living there for five years, and then moving to Argentina in 1950 where he continued his propaganda activities. During this period he was a contributor to Der Weg, a Nazi publication founded in Buenos Aires in 1947. He was praised by Haj Amin al-Husseini for his loyalty to Arab nationalism. Thereafter he moved from Argentina to Egypt.

The Swedish journalist and writer Elisabeth Åsbrink probed the reasons for Sweden's centrality in the European far-right scene in her book 1947: When Now Begins. In it she portrays Per Engdahl (1909–1994), the man who led the Swedish fascist movement. Engdahl created an escape route for Nazis from all parts of Europe. It passed through northern Germany and Denmark, and led to Malmö. From there the Nazis were smuggled to various places in southern Sweden and then sent by ship from Gothenburg to South America. Engdahl claimed to have "saved" about 4,000 Nazis in this way. One of those whom Engdahl assisted was Johann von Leers, who "arrived in Malmö in 1947, and ... got to Buenos Aires, where he edited a paper that became a communications channel between Nazis in Europe and those who ended up in Latin America. Von Leers was later brought to Egypt under the auspices of Haj Amin al-Husseini, with whom he was in close contact. Eventually he converted to Islam and changed his name to Omar Amin as a gesture to his benefactor, becoming head of [Egyptian President Gamal Abdel] Nasser's 'Israeli' propaganda unit."
Von Leers was welcomed in Egypt by al-Husseini and he became the political adviser to the Information Department under Muhammad Naguib and Gamal Abdel Nasser. He served as head of the Institute for the Study of Zionism, managing anti-Israeli propaganda. He was a mentor of Ahmed Huber and networked with Muslim emigres in Hamburg, while also being an acquaintance of Otto Ernst Remer in the country.

References

Further reading
 Martin A. Lee, The Beast Reawakens, 1997, 
 Philip Rees, Biographical Dictionary of the Extreme Right Since 1890, 1991, 
 Irving Sedar and Harold J. Greenberg, Behind the Egyptian Sphinx: Nasser's Strange Bedfellows: Prelude to World War III?, Philadelphia, Chilton Co., 1960

External links
 

1902 births
1965 deaths
People from the Grand Duchy of Mecklenburg-Schwerin
20th-century Freikorps personnel
Antisemitism in Germany
Converts to Islam
Converts to Sunni Islam from Protestantism
German expatriates in Argentina
German expatriates in Egypt
German expatriates in Italy
German Muslims
Nazi Party politicians
Nazi propagandists
Nazis in South America
People from Ludwigslust-Parchim
German male writers